Ahmed Al-Ghamdi  [أحمد الغامديin Arabic] (born 15 July 1994) is a Saudi football player who plays for Ohod as a goalkeeper.

References

External links 
 

1994 births
Living people
Saudi Arabian footballers
Al-Ahli Saudi FC players
Al-Wehda Club (Mecca) players
Al-Raed FC players
Ohod Club players
Saudi Professional League players
Saudi First Division League players
Association football goalkeepers